The 1949 All-Ireland Junior Hurling Championship was the 28th staging of the All-Ireland Junior Championship since its establishment by the Gaelic Athletic Association in 1912.

Meath entered the championship as the defending champions, however, they were beaten in the Leinster Championship.

The All-Ireland final was played on 9 October 1949 at Cusack Park in Ennis, between London and Clare, in what was their first ever meeting in the final. London won the match by 3–07 to 3–06 to claim their second championship title overall and a first title in 11 years.

Results

All-Ireland Junior Hurling Championship

All-Ireland semi-finals

All-Ireland home final

All-Ireland finals

References

Junior
All-Ireland Junior Hurling Championship